Sicheng is a railway station of Taiwan Railways Administration Yilan line located in Toucheng Township, Yilan County, Taiwan.

History
The station was opened on 25 February 1921.

See also
 List of railway stations in Taiwan

References

1921 establishments in Taiwan
Railway stations in Yilan County, Taiwan
Railway stations opened in 1921
Railway stations served by Taiwan Railways Administration